The ATS GT is a sports car manufactured by Italian automobile manufacturer Automobili Turismo e Sport (ATS). Introduced in 2017, the car pays homage to the company's first and only production model to date, the ATS 2500 GT.

History and development 

In 1961, Ferrari dominated the competition in Formula One racing but a few of its executives and employees were not satisfied with how the company was being run, especially the influence exerted on the company by Enzo Ferrari's wife Laura Dominica Garello Ferrari. Ferrari did not agree with the aggrieved employees and fired them all citing that "over evaluation of relevance to marginal facts that have nothing to do with the normal operation of a company."

The group of eight technicians and engineers which were laid off decided to start their own company. Thus led by Carlo Chiti and Giotto Bizzarrini, they formed Automobile Turismo e Sport (ATS) and set about developing an F1 car for the 1962 season in order to stack up competition with Ferrari. But the venture was not successful. After running two cars in five races and facing retirement in majority of the races, the best result the company achieved was an 11th place. The program soon folded up in early 1963 due to repeated failures.

The company also focused on manufacturing a road car with the objective of creating a successful automobile business. In lieu of that, the ATS 2500 GT was developed and introduced at the 1963 Geneva Motor Show. Featuring a 2.5-litre V8 engine, the 2500 GT was the first mid-engine road car to reach the production stage. The 2500 GT was to be followed by a more powerful GTS variant but hard times hit the company. Due to their failure in F1, the company soon faced its demise and folded up in 1964 after having produced just 12 cars.

The ATS marque was bought by two investors in 2014 namely Emanuele Bomboi and Daniele Maritan. The newly resurrected marque set out to develop the GT, a car that captured the spirit of the original 2500 GT.

Specifications

The front design of the car easily mimics the shape of the 2500 GT with a chin spoiler and triangular headlamps. Based on a McLaren 12C/650S, the car borrows many elements from its donor car, including the airbrake, wing mirrors and dihedral doors along with mechanical components such as the engine and transmission. The rear of the car features an opaque engine cover made from carbon fibre along with rounded tail lamps and a wide mesh grille with a sweeping rear diffuser making it different than the original 2500 GT in terms of design language. An interesting design element to note is a shape running from the rear of the car and ending on the rear quarter window. The shape mimics the aerodynamic profile of the original 2500 GT. Sensors hidden in flanks of the car open the doors thus doing away with conventional door handles.

Ergonomics have been kept into focus on the interior. A TFT instrument cluster contains options for configuring the powertrain, suspension and aerodynamic components. The car's infotainment system makes use of Google maps. Other notable features include wireless charging and a premium Prima Orchestra hi-fi system that has 3 mm speakers at strategic points in the interior to provide good sound quality. The interior is finished in Nubuck leather and can be tailored to the customer's specifications.

The GT is powered by a 3.8-litre twin-turbocharged M838T V8 engine borrowed from the donor car.

Performance 

Production  
ATS has announced a production run of 12 cars. Each car will be built exactly to the customer specifications and no two cars will be similar to one another.

References

External links 
 

Cars of Italy
Cars introduced in 2017
Rear mid-engine, rear-wheel-drive vehicles
Sports cars